Denzel Irby (born  1993), known professionally as Denny Love, is an American actor. His biggest roles were Barry on Empire and Chip "the Colonel" Martin in the miniseries Looking for Alaska. He also had minor roles on Chicago P.D. and Lucifer, and appeared in the 2020 film Unpregnant.

Early life and education 
Love is from Madison, Wisconsin. He was raised by his grandmother, and belonged to the Boys and Girls Club of Dane County. He attended Madison West High School, then studied theater at DePaul University, graduating in 2015.

Career

Empire 
Love appeared in three episodes of Empire as Barry.

Looking for Alaska 
Though Love was unfamiliar with John Green's work he read the novel Looking for Alaska in preparation, and for his audition he recited a monologue from the book. He received a phone call of congratulations from him upon getting the role.

Love appeared in all eight episodes of Looking for Alaska as Chip "the Colonel" Martin, a Black scholarship student at the fictional Culver Creek Academy. In the novel, the Colonel's race is not specified but is assumed to be white. Nasim Mansuri, writing for Hypable, says, "In no part of the novel does it say that the Colonel is Black, and being Black doesn’t particularly change his character… but [...] his race brings a lot more meaning to every interaction. It also makes the Colonel’s rage a lot more understandable, even if his actions aren’t always justified.

Filmography

Film

Television

References 

African-American male actors
Actors from Madison, Wisconsin
American male television actors
American male film actors
1990s births
Year of birth uncertain
Living people
21st-century American male actors
Male actors from Wisconsin